The Haunted Carousel is the eighth installment in the Nancy Drew point-and-click adventure game series by Her Interactive. The game is available for play on Microsoft Windows platforms. It has an ESRB rating of E for moments of mild violence and peril. Players take on the first-person view of fictional amateur sleuth Nancy Drew and must solve the mystery through interrogation of suspects, solving puzzles, and discovering clues. 

The game was released in August 2003. Upon its release, the game elicited favorable reviews from gaming critics, who commended its graphics and plot. During 2003, the game sold more than 48,000 copies in the United States.

Plot
Paula Santos, the owner of Captain's Cove Amusement Park in New Jersey, has asked Nancy for help because there have been mysterious things happening at the park.  First, the lead horse disappeared off the carousel. After that the carousel began mysteriously starting up in the middle of the night. Then the roller coaster suddenly lost power, resulting in a serious accident. The park is shut down until the city knows what caused it. There is a rumor going around that the park is cursed. Drew must determine whether the painted ponies are searching for their missing lead horse, or whether there is another explanation for the "midnight rides."

Wrong decisions can cause the game to end. In previous volumes of the series, these endings typically involved Drew's death; however, in The Haunted Carousel, a more frequent conclusion is Drew being fired for a mishap.

Gameplay
There are two levels of gameplay: a "Junior" mode, and a "Senior" detective mode. Each mode offers a different difficulty level of puzzles and hints, but neither of these changes affect the actual plot of the game.

Development
The game is loosely based on a book of the same name, The Haunted Carousel (1983).

Characters
Adapted from the game's official site.
Nancy Drew - Nancy is an 18-year-old amateur detective from the fictional town of River Heights in the United States. She is the only playable character in the game, which means the player must solve the mystery from her perspective.
Elliot Chen - Elliott is the park's art director and is responsible for all the visual components at Captain's Cove. He is a major procrastinator and is currently several weeks behind on his projects. The park's shutdown could seriously help him get caught up. He has no theory on what is happening at the park.
Harlan Bishop - Harlan is the park's recently hired security guard, and he oversees the security system of Captain's Cove. He is helpful, efficient, and good at his job, but very evasive about his past.  He's eager to prove to his bosses that they should keep him permanently. He thinks the mysterious occurrences are just a coincidence, and doesn't believe in the hauntings.
Ingrid Corey - Ingrid is the chief engineer of the park and maintains all the rides at Captain's Cove, even the ones that have malfunctioned. She is extremely smart, but she is overworked while the park is understaffed during the shutdown. She is interested in holistic medicine and believes the park is actually cursed.
Joy Trent - Joy is the park's bookkeeper, and she is in charge of all of the park's financial records. Joy's father used to be co-owner of Captain's Cove until Paula Santos bought him out when he went bankrupt. Joy is a nervous, sad, and slightly reclusive person who believes that the owner of the park is behind the haunting as a publicity stunt.

Cast
Nancy Drew - Lani Minella
Joy Trent - Laurie Jerger
Elliot Chen - Gary Hoffman
Harlan Bishop/Anton Sukov/Receptionist/Miles the Magnificent Memory Machine - Jonah von Spreekin
Ingrid Corey - Kathleen Howe
Paula Santos - Keri Healey
Bess Marvin - Alisa Murray
George Fayne - Maureen Nelson
Frank Hardy - Joshua Silwa
Joe Hardy - Rob Jones
Detective K.J. Perris/Tink Obermier - Fred Draeger
Lance Huffington/Luis Guerra - Max Holechek

Reception

Critical
Upon its release, The Haunted Carousel received favorable reviews from critics. On Review aggregation website Metacritic, the game holds a score of 85 out of 100, denoting "generally favorable reviews." The Haunted Carousel remains the Her Interactive game with the most favorable critical reception, according to MetaCritic. In a review for Just Adventure, critic Ray Ivey awarded the album a letter grade of "A." He commended the graphics as "crisp, clean, colorful and appealing," deemed it the "tightest game so far in the series," and praised the game's shortness, observing that its brevity is in keeping with that of the book series. Writing for GameZone, critic Anise Hollingshead commended the album for providing a game for teenagers that's free of "graphic violence and sexual content," and opined that it was particularly fitting for players between the ages of 12 and 16. She awarded the gameplay a score of 9 out of 10, while graphics and sound each garnered 8 out of 10, and concept 7 out of 10.

Charles Herold of The New York Times wrote that The Haunted Carousel "returns to form with intelligent puzzles and an intriguing story."

Commercial
According to PC Data, The Haunted Carousel sold 48,500 retail copies in North America during 2003.

References

External links
Official site (archived)

2003 video games
Detective video games
Video games based on Nancy Drew
Point-and-click adventure games
Video games developed in the United States
Video games scored by Kevin Manthei
Video games set in amusement parks
Video games set in New Jersey
Windows games
Windows-only games
Her Interactive games
Single-player video games
North America-exclusive video games